Jeon Hye-jin (born June 17, 1988) is a South Korean actress.

Personal life
Jeon married her Smile, You co-star Lee Chun-hee on March 11, 2011. Their daughter, Lee So-yu, was born on July 30, 2011.

Filmography

Film

Television series

Television shows

Discography

Singles

References

External links

1972 births
Living people
South Korean television actresses
South Korean film actresses
Dongguk University alumni